Mrinal is an Indian given name with predominantly masculine usage. The feminine counterpart of the name is Mrinalini. Other variations of the name include Mrunal (or Mrunalini) depending upon the linguistics of origin of the person. Some notable personalities with this name include:

 Mrinal Das, Indian trade unionist
 Mrinal Gore, Indian politician
 Mrinal Haque, Bangladeshi sculptor
 Mrinal Hazarika, ex-commander of the 28th Battalion of ULFA, the banned revolutionary organisation of Assam
 Mrinal Pande, Indian television personality
 Mrinal Sen, Indian Bengali film director
 Mrinal Thakur, academic

See also 
 Mrunal Thakur, an Indian film and TV actress

Hindu given names
Indian given names